David Rice (born 1 January 1989) is an English former tennis player. He is best known for his activity on the doubles circuit, where he usually played with Sean Thornley.

Career
He qualified for the Wimbledon men's doubles for the first time in June 2011 with Sean Thornley. They lost in the first round to Jamie Murray and Sergiy Stakhovsky, 3–6, 5–7. He has played in Wimbledon 3 times.

After failing to qualify in 2012, he and Thornley were awarded a wildcard for the 2013 championship, losing 4–6, 3–6, 7–6(7), 6–4, 4–6 to Marinko Matosevic and Frank Moser.

Challenger and Futures finals

Singles: 19 (7–12)

Doubles: 59 (34–25)

Retirement
Rice played his final match against Stefano Napolitano in 2016, and having lost retired and became a tennis coach in London.

References

External links
 
 
 LTA profile

English male tennis players
British male tennis players
Living people
1989 births
Sportspeople from High Wycombe
People from Croxley Green
Tennis people from Buckinghamshire